T-League or T League may refer to:

Thai football leagues, see Thai football league system
Thai League 1
T.League, Japanese table tennis league
National Premier Leagues Tasmania